Manuel Vidal may refer to:
Manuel Vidal Fernández (born 1929), Cuban artist
Manuel Vidal (1901-1965), Spanish footballer

See also:
Héctor Manuel Vidal (1943-2014), Uruguayan theater director
Manuel Gual Vidal (1903-1954), Mexican jurist